The  were constructed in 1902 during works on the Kiso River in Yatomi, Aichi Prefecture, Japan. They are an example of western hydraulic engineering technology adopted during the Meiji period.

See also

Ishii lock
Foreign government advisors in Meiji Japan
Mechanical Engineering Heritage (Japan)

References

Science and technology in Japan
Buildings of the Meiji period
Rivers of Aichi Prefecture
Infrastructure completed in 1902
Empire of Japan
Rivers of Japan